Stoke, also referred to by its earlier name of Stoke Damerel, is a parish, that was once part of the historical Devonport, England; this was prior to 1914. In 1914, Devonport and Plymouth amalgamated with Stonehouse: the new town took the name of Plymouth. Since the amalgamation Stoke has been an inner suburb of Plymouth, Devon.

Stoke is now densely built up with family houses and bisected by the main railway line from Paddington to Penzance. The parish church is notable not only for its evolving architecture, but also its contents and historical connections. The area has been prosperous for several hundred years, and there are some distinguished private houses dating to Georgian and Victorian times (several of which feature in Nikolaus Pevsner's South Devon: Penguin Books, 1952, content (revised and enlarged) issued New Haven: Yale U. P. 1989. ).

Stoke Damerel Primary School educates approximately 320 pupils of ages 4–11.

Devonport High School for Boys on Paradise Road draws pupils from all over the city and parts of South West Devon and South East Cornwall.

Notable people
 Mary Fergusson (1914–1997), British engineer, and the first female fellow of the Institution of Civil Engineers
 Captain Tobias Furneaux (1735–1781), a Royal Navy officer and the first man to circumnavigate the globe in both directions.
 Rev John Hawker
 John Scott - Robert Falcon Scott's father
 Thomas B. Jeffery, inventor, bicycle and vehicle manufacturer. Founder of the Brand name "Rambler", see Rambler bicycles and Rambler cars

References

 

Suburbs of Plymouth, Devon